Aar  is a village  located in Girwa Tehsil of Udaipur district in the Indian state of Rajasthan. As per Population Census 2011, Aachhat village has population of 1007 of which 513 are males while 494 are females.

References 

Villages in Udaipur district